Arbanitis melancholicus is a species of armoured trap-door spider in the family Idiopidae,  and is endemic to New South Wales.

It was first described by William Joseph Rainbow and Robert Henry Pulleine in 1918 as Dyarcyops melancholicus.  However, in 1985 Barbara Main placed it in synonymy with Misgolas rapax In 2006, Wishart recognised it once more as a separate species and it became Misgolas melancholicus.  This was reconfirmed by Wishart in 2011. In 2017 Michael Rix and others returned it to the genus, Arbanitis.

References

External links

Idiopidae
Spiders described in 1918
Spiders of Australia
Fauna of New South Wales
Taxa named by William Joseph Rainbow